Dashcam is a 2021 computer screen horror film directed by Rob Savage and written by Gemma Hurley, Savage, and Jed Shepherd. The film stars Annie Hardy, Amer Chadha-Patel, and Angela Enahoro. The entire film is shot from the perspective of either Hardy's hand-held iPhone or the dashcam in her car, as she livestreams her actions for viewers whose comments on the events are also displayed. The film follows Hardy, playing a semi-fictionalized version of herself, as she visits a friend in London amidst the COVID-19 pandemic, and finds herself in a series of nightmarish events after giving a strange woman a ride in her car. The film is produced by Jason Blum through his Blumhouse Productions banner, alongside Douglas Cox, and Savage.

Savage and co-writer Jed Shepherd developed the idea for Dashcam based on a live-streamed video series shared on YouTube by Hardy—singer of the indie rock band Giant Drag—entitled Band Car, in which Hardy would work out song ideas before viewers while driving in Los Angeles. Savage felt the concept would make for a good found footage-style horror film, and ultimately asked Hardy to appear in the film herself.

Dashcam had its world premiere at the 2021 Toronto International Film Festival on 13 September 2021, where it was named second runner up for the People's Choice Award: Midnight Madness. It was later released theatrically in the United Kingdom and the United States on 3 June 2022. The film received polarized reviews, with praise for the scares, but criticism for its unlikable lead character.

Plot

Annie Hardy is a right-wing internet personality and musician who live streams out of her car, making music and using her viewers' comments as lyrics. Tired of COVID-19 restrictions and homelessness in Los Angeles, Annie books a flight to London. There, she pays a visit to her former bandmate Stretch, who now works as a food delivery driver, and his girlfriend Gemma's house. Although Stretch is initially pleased to reunite with Annie, Gemma quickly clashes with her over their views on COVID-19 and politics. Annie accompanies Stretch on his delivery job where she frustrates Stretch and antagonizes restaurant owners with her anti-mask views.

Returning home, a furious Gemma attacks Annie. Annie later overhears Gemma forcing Stretch to kick her out. In response, Annie steals Stretch's car and phone before deciding to take a delivery for him, intending to eat it herself. When she arrives at the restaurant, Annie is surprised to find it abandoned before she encounters the owner who offers Annie a large sum of money to transport a frail old woman named Angela to an undisclosed location. Annie reluctantly accepts the offer and begins driving with Angela while live-streaming everything to her fans. Angela defecates herself, forcing the pair to stop at a diner. While cleaning Angela, Annie is surprised to discover an Ariana Grande tattoo on her stomach. A woman soon enters the diner looking for Angela and attacks Annie. Annie fends her off and witnesses Angela exhibiting strange powers before fleeing back to the car.

Stretch, having tracked Annie down via the live stream, forces his way into the car where they are both unnerved by Angela suddenly appearing inside. As they drive away, Stretch and Annie get into an argument before pulling over. Angela vanishes and Stretch ventures into the nearby forest to find her. He soon finds her standing atop a tree and falls trying to reach her after which Angela floats to the ground. The woman who attacked Annie returns with a shotgun and attempts to kill Annie and Stretch. They escape her and return to the car with Angela. As they drive away, Annie discovers that Angela's mouth has been stapled shut. Angela rips the staples off and attempts to bite Annie, distracting Stretch who crashes into another car, killing two newlyweds inside. Angela attacks the pair, showing supernatural abilities and aggression.

Fleeing, the duo attempt to flag down a passing car for help only for the car to run over Stretch. The shotgun-wielding woman exits the car and reveals herself to be Angela's mother, attempting to track her down. She kidnaps Stretch and threatens to shoot him if Annie doesn't tell her where Angela is. Meanwhile, the livestream goes viral and a horde of viewers enter the chat. Annie attempts to drive away in the mother's car. Annie gets shot at, crashes the car, and is attacked. With the help of Stretch, Annie manages to trap the mother's arm in the steering wheel and snap it. Distraught and desperate, Angela's mother explains that she is actually 16 years old and shows a recent photo of a young Angela with the same tattoo. However, Angela appears, rips her mother's head off, and pursues Annie and Stretch.

The pair seek refuge in an abandoned amusement park but Angela quickly hunts them down and kills Stretch. Annie escapes and drives away in a new car but Angela, who is chasing the car, causes it to crash. Angela breaks into the car trying to kill Annie and uses her powers to push the car into a lake. Annie traps Angela in the car and escapes, collapsing on the shore. Unbeknownst to Annie, Angela levitates out of the water and into the sky. Annie makes her way to a remote house and makes her way inside, finding the property abandoned. As Annie celebrates her victory against Angela, she quickly realizes she is at the address she was instructed to take Angela to. Supernatural forces stop Annie from escaping and she flees, stumbling across occult symbols. Annie encounters a group of cult members who slit their throats simultaneously before being attacked by Angela. Annie uses a knife to kill Angela. At the same time, a humanoid, slug-like creature bursts out of Angela's mouth and hunts for Annie, who flees into a tunnel, where she finds Stretch's wrecked car, among other vehicles. Annie uses her keyboard to beat the creature to death.

Exhausted from the night's events, Annie collapses in Stretch's car, and the livestream starts up again. As viewers enter the chat, Annie starts to rap about her experience, even breaking the fourth wall upon returning home.

Cast

Production

Development and casting

The film was developed by writer-director Rob Savage and co-writer Jed Shepherd, who initially came up with the idea for the film based on Giant Drag singer Annie Hardy's Band Car, a series of live-streamed videos shared by Hardy via YouTube in which she would work out song ideas while driving her car in Los Angeles. Savage commented that "When [co-writer] Jed [Shepherd] showed me the show, the first conversations were like, ‘Oh, that’s a cool set-up for a found footage movie,’ and the version we were taking around pre-Host was very much just using the Band Car set-up, but the idea was to probably take it to studios, to probably try and get an actor to play that role." Instead, Savage asked Hardy to star in the film herself, to which she agreed.

Filming
Filming of Dashcam took place in England in late 2020.

Soundtrack
In promotion of the film, Hardy's band, Giant Drag, released the digital single "Devil Inside" in June 2022. The song is featured in the film's closing credits.

Release
Dashcam premiered at the 2021 Toronto International Film Festival on 13 September 2021. In February 2022, Momentum Pictures purchased the distribution rights for the film.

Reception 
On review aggregator Rotten Tomatoes, the film holds an approval rating of 48% based on 86 reviews, with an average rating of 5.2/10. The website's critics consensus reads: "DASHCAM is visually and thematically provocative, although the film's grating protagonist undercuts its effectiveness." On Metacritic, the film has a weighted average score of 48 out of 100, based on 23 critics, indicating "mixed or average reviews".

Clarisse Loughry of The Independent praised the film, calling it "a riot. Sure, it’s a film whose spell I can imagine being instantly broken the second you remove it from the precise context it was made for – in a cinema, with as large an audience as possible, all of them hooting and hollering – but that should hardly be counted as a mark against it. If anything, it’s proof that Savage knows exactly the kind of film he’s making. Dashcam is pure chaos, headlined by a character with a maelstrom for a personality."

Dennis Harvey of Variety gave the film a middling review, noting that, "as a showcase for [Hardy], Dashcam may be a little too much of a good thing — she’s an acting natural, but this character is so vividly irksome it turns the whole film into a sort of deliberately off-putting standup routine," adding that "Dashcam feels longer than the bare 66 minutes it logs pre-final credits. It’s a clever stunt — still, not so clever that it can’t wear out its welcome."

References

External links
 

2021 films
2021 horror films
American horror films
American splatter films
British horror films
Blumhouse Productions films
Demons in film
Films about the COVID-19 pandemic
Films about spirit possession
Films produced by Jason Blum
Found footage films
Screenlife films
2020s English-language films
2020s American films
2020s British films